Al Nassma Chocolate LLC is a manufacturer and retailer of camel milk chocolates. Founded in Dubai in 2008, the company retails its products in Dubai and in Europe, Hong Kong, and Malaysia.

History 
Al Nassma Chocolate is the United Arab Emirates' first and only camel milk chocolate brand, founded on October 22, 2008. The development and launch of the brand took almost four years.

Products 
The company's products include 70g camel milk chocolate bars in several flavours: whole milk, nuts and cocoa 70% (dark), Arabia (with a mix of Arabian spices such as cardamom and cinnamon), macadamia orange and dates; camel-shaped chocolates, Camel Caravan, with macadamia nut and honey cream filling; hollow camel figures; and various kinds of pralines.

Arab cuisine traditionally includes camel milk in various forms, and was a staple of the diet of Bedouins until mid-20th century. The company uses mild cocoa beans roasted in a manner that doesn't overpower the slight saltiness of camel milk.

Its 70g chocolate bars are wrapped in double printed gold foil; while pralines are packaged in boxes resembling camel hide. Wooden boxes sourced from Holzmanufaktur Liebich in Germany are used for Camel Caravan, and the camel figures are wrapped in golden foil, and packed in gift boxes.

Production process 
Al Nassma manufactures its own chocolates from cocoa beans. In 2006 the company set up a Halal-certified production facility. The milk from which the chocolates are produced comes from camels at the Camelicious Farm in Umm Nahad. The farm belongs to Emirates Industry for Camel Milk & Products (EICMP). The farm houses over 3,500 camels. The camels are milked twice daily, yielding around 5,000 litres of raw camel milk, which is pasteurised in an ISO 22000 certified dairy plant. A portion of the milk is bottled for sale under the Camelicious label. The remaining is freeze-dried and airlifted to be sent to a factory in Austria where the chocolate mass is manufactured in a chocolate mass factory.

Al Nassma makes use of around 150 ml of fresh and pasteurised camel milk in one bar of whole milk chocolate. All ingredients – including camel milk, sugar, cocoa beans, cocoa paste, cocoa butter, bourbon vanilla, honey, Arabian spices, pistachios, dates, macadamia nuts and orange zest have no artificial colour or additives.

The molding of most products as well as most of the packaging is done at the company's headquarter in Dubai, UAE.

Spread & reach 
Since its inception in 2008, Al Nassma has sold its camel milk chocolate mainly through camel-shaped kiosks. There is also an Al Nassma branded shop at the Camelicious camel farm in the desert.

There are sales kiosks at The Dubai Mall, including ‘At the Top’, Burj Khalifa, the Burj Al Arab, Souk Madinat Jumeirah, Jumeirah Hotels & Resorts, Bab Al Shams Hotel, Emirates Towers Hotel, Atlantis, The Palm, Kempinski, Grand Hyatt and Anantara Hotels & Resorts. It is sold in duty free outlets in the Persian Gulf region, including Dubai Duty Free, Qatar Duty Free.

In 2009 Al Nassma started exporting its camel milk chocolates via UPS to Japan, Hong Kong, Malaysia and the US, Germany, Switzerland, Austria, Czech Republic, France and the UK.

The products are sold in retail locations within UAE shopping malls, hotels and resorts and in duty frees in several countries. They are also sold at Julius Meinl am Graben in Vienna and Prague since 2013, and at Selfridges in  London since early 2014, and KaDeWe in Berlin.
  
In June 2014, Al Nassma and Gebr. Heinemann opened duty-free sales in Vienna Duty Free and Istanbul Duty Free, and on cruise liners of MSC Cruises.

References

Bibliography
Deborah R. Prinz, Deborah Prinz. On the Chocolate Trail: A Delicious Adventure Connecting Jews, Religions, History, Travel, Rituals and Recipes to the Magic of Cacao. Paperback – October 1, 2012; Page 156
Linda Low- Abu Dhabi's Vision 2030: An Ongoing Journey of Economic Development. Hardcover July 16, 2012; Page 35
Rainer Hermann- Die Golfstaaten: Wohin geht das neue Arabien?- Die Zukunft der arabischen Welt 1 Oct 2011; Page 
Rurubu Resort Dubai-るるぶドバイ. September 2012; Page 33
Emiko Furuya- 世界の恵美子古谷チョコレート.Chocolate in the World. 14 Januar 2010; Page 4
Camel Milk - New Observations. U. Wernery.. Central Veterinary Labs, Dubai, UAE.
Proceedings of International Camel Conference, Feb. 16/17, 2007; Page 200 – 204.

External links 

Chocolate companies
Companies based in Dubai
2008 establishments in the United Arab Emirates
Food and drink companies of the United Arab Emirates
Emirati brands
Camel products
Food and drink companies established in 2008